Nagpur Division SECR is one of the three railway divisions under South East Central Railway Zone of Indian Railways. This railway division was formed on 1 April 1952 and its headquarter is located at Nagpur in the state of Maharashtra in India.

Bilaspur railway division and Raipur railway division are the other two railway divisions under SECR Zone headquartered at Bilaspur.

List of railway stations and towns 
The list includes the stations under the SECR Nagpur Railway Division and their station category.

Stations closed for Passengers -

References

 
Divisions of Indian Railways
1952 establishments in Bombay State

Transport in Nagpur